
Collins GEM is a collection of miniature books by HarperCollins. The original Collins firm published its first dictionary in 1824, and its first series of Collins Illustrated Dictionaries in 1840, including the Sixpenny Pocket Pronouncing Dictionary, which sold approximately 1 million copies. With the invention of steam presses in the 1860s, Collins became able to publish books and dictionaries in all sizes.

The precursor of the Gem format (four inches high and two-and-a-half wide) was the Collins Gem Diary, which became popular in the 1880s. The first Collins Gem English Dictionary was published in the late 1890s. Shortly afterwards came the Collins Gem Pocket Pronouncing Dictionary of 1902. These were followed by foreign language editions, travel and reference guides.

Titles issued during the 1960s and 1970s (ranging beyond the staple language dictionaries) included the Dictionary of the Bible (1964), Decimal Gem Reckoner (1966), Dictionary of Biography (1971), and Gazetteer of the World (1973). Others covered quotations, first names, synonyms and antonyms, spelling and word division, and crossword puzzles. Collins also issued a related series of "Nutshell Books" during the 1960s in a larger format, a response to the successful Teach Yourself series by rival publishers Hodder & Stoughton.

In the 1980s Collins Gem guides were updated and expanded with extensive colour illustrations. There was a further modernisation and re-design in the Spring of 2004, including a new cover design, new internal layouts and a size increase to 4.6 high by 3.2 inches wide. It is still an active imprint.

This is a list of what is in the current and recent Gem collection. Any of the books on the list that have the author being "Collins GEM", "Harper Collins (UK)", "Collins UK" or "HarperCollins Publishers" means that no specific information is given as to who the author is.

Guidebooks

Dictionaries

See also
 Harper Collins

 John Wiseman

References

External links
 A list on Amazon.co.uk for Collins GEM books

Collins GEM
.